Hind Kamel (Arabic; هند كامل) is an Iraqi actress and film director now residing in Jordan.

Born in Baghdad, Kamel has a Bachelor of Arts from the Academy of Fine Arts in Baghdad in 1984. She rose to fame as an actress between the eighties and nineties across Iraq and the Persian Gulf region, in particular, Kuwait, Saudi Arabia, Qatar and the United Arab Emirates.

Filmography 
 The Mirror - Television series (1984)
 Flaming borders - Sana (1986)

References

External links 

Hind Kamel at Flixster
Hind Kamel Filmography at Fandango

Year of birth missing (living people)
Living people
People from Baghdad
Iraqi film actresses
Iraqi film directors
Arabic-language film directors
Iraqi